Greensleeves Rhythm Album #2: Virus is an album in Greensleeves Records' rhythm album series.  It was released in March 2000 on CD and LP.  The album features various artists recorded over the "Virus" riddim, produced by the Madd Dawgz production team of Mikey Williams, Tony Thomas, and Delon Reid.  The riddim contains elements of the international hit Baby One More Time by Britney Spears. Virus riddim is a riddim.

Track listing
"Caan Hold We Dung" - Capleton
"Itsy Bitsy" - Mr. Vegas
"Monkeys Out" - Lexxus
"Gal To Man" - Mad Cobra
"Mr. Riggi Up" - Degree
"Go Look A Life" - Elephant Man
"Kerry-Ann" - Red Rat
"Bun" - Hawkeye
"My Youth" - Madd Anju
"Dem Gal Yah" - Kiprich
"Ghetto Ride" - Egg Nog
"Stop Who" - Alley Cat
"No Dyke" - Foxy Cat
"I Want It That Way" - Delon
"Money Man A Look" - Goofy
"Dutty Behaviour" - Major Sample
"Bling Bling" - Frassman
"Virus Jugglin' Megamix" - various

2000 compilation albums
Reggae compilation albums
Greensleeves Records albums